"Amore scusami" is a 1964 song composed by Gino Mescoli and Vito Pallavicini.  The song premiered at the Un disco per l'estate music festival with a performance of John Foster, and then got an immediate commercial success, peaking at third place on the Italian hit parade and remaining in the top ten for five months.

Background 
The song portrays the crisis of a sentimental relationship, and it is regarded as an innovation for the Italian music of the time for its  realistic lyrics and for the absence of pathetic and pitiful tones.

Cover Versions
It was later covered by numerous artists, including:
Rita Pavone 
Dalida
Jula De Palma
Rosanna Fratello
Giuseppe Di Stefano
Fausto Papetti 
Elvina Makarian (Armenian Jazz singer)
Andre Hazes (Dutch Singer) 
"Amore scusami" was adapted in French by Dalida
"Amore scusami" was adapted in English as "My Love, Forgive Me" by Sydney Lee and was recorded by:  
Robert Goulet whose 1964 recording peaked at number sixteen on the Hot 100, number three on the Middle-of-the-Road Singles chart, and number 22 in Canada.
Jerry Vale
Lovelace Watkins
The Ray Charles Singers
Patrizio Buanne in The Italian (2005)
Peggy Lee

Track listing

 7" single – STMS 588 
 "Amore scusami"  (Gino Mescoli, Vito Pallavicini)
 "Dedicata a Paola" (Bruno Lauzi, Maggiorino Icardi, Elio Isola)

Charts

References

 

1964 singles
Italian songs
1964 songs
Songs with lyrics by Vito Pallavicini